1967 Soviet Class B was a Soviet football competition at the Soviet third tier. 

The competition consisted of two stages and involved participation of 190 teams
 at the first stage 126 teams in seven groups of the Russian Federation identified the Russian Federation semifinal participants. In those groups also participated teams of Union republics other than Ukraine and Central Asia that identified participants of their semifinals. In two groups of Ukraine 42 teams identified participants of the Ukraine final tournament. Also, 22 more teams of the Central Asia and Kazakhstan played for their single berth to the Class A, Second Group.
 at the second stage participants of the Russian Federation and Union republics semifinals identified participants of the Russian Federation and Union republics finals. Then, teams from Ukraine, Russian Federation and Union republics in finals identified winners.

Russian Federation

Semifinal Group 1
 [Astrakhan]

Semifinal Group 2
 [Lipetsk]

Semifinal Group 3
 [Makhachkala]

Semifinal Group 4
 [Ulyanovsk]

Final group
 [Nov 5-25, Makhachkala, Astrakhan]

Ukraine

Final group
 [Oct 24 – Nov 2, Severodonetsk, Kadiyevka]

Central Asia

Union republics

Final
 [Nov 5, Chernigov]
 Neman Grodno  1-0  Polad Sumgait

References
 All-Soviet Archive Site
 Results. RSSSF

Soviet Second League seasons
3
Soviet
Soviet